Shobha Ram Kumawat (7 January 1914 – 23 March 1984) was an Indian Independence activist and Politician from the Indian National Congress political party and was a Member of Parliament of the 1st Lok Sabha  and 2nd Lok Sabha representing the Alwar Parliamentary Constituency in the Rajasthan state of India.

Early life and education 
Shobha Ram Kumawat was born to father Buddha Ram Kumawat and mother Jhuntha Devi Kumawat on 7 January 1914 in Kathumar of Alwar princely state in Rajputana Agency, British India.

He got his education from Raj Rishi College of Alwar (Inter) and Sanatan Dharma College of Kanpur (BCom; MA in Economics; LLB).
Shobha Ram Kumawat was married on 12 December 1932 with Ram Pyari Kumawat, a resident of Vrindavan.

He had five daughters: Susheela, Vimala (married to Bhagwatilal of Udaipur), Indira Kumawat (married to IPS Mahendra Kumawat), Chandrakanta (Married to Adv Yogendra Prasad of Sawai Madhopur District) and Dr Kamlesh Varma (married to Dr Ajay Varma).

Shobha Ram Kumawat's brothers Chiranjilal Kumawat and Prabhudayal Kumawat were also freedom fighters and brothers Hukumchandra Kumawat and Hazarilal Kumawat were teachers and social workers.

Shobha Ram Kumawat died of cardiac arrest (heart attack) on 23 March 1984 in Jaipur, Rajasthan state, India.

Political career
Shobha Ram Kumawat was the first and only chief minister of the United States of Matsya, serving from its formation on 18 March 1948 until it was merged into the United State of Rajasthan on 15 May 1949. Following that he was the first Revenue Minister of the Rajasthan government from 1949 to 1950. In 1952 he was elected as a member of the 1st Lok Sabha for the Alwar Lok Sabha constituency. He was elected again in 1957 for the 2nd Lok Sabha but lost his chair in 1962 in the elections for the 3rd Lok Sabha. Following that he was member of the Rajasthan Legislative Assembly on the fourth (1967–72) and fifth (1972–77) assemblies.

Shobha Ram Kumawat also served as the head of the Rajasthan Pradesh Congress Committee.

Political offices held
 Chief minister (only) of Matsya Union (1948–49)
 Member of All India Congress Committee (1948–50)
 Revenue Minister (first) of the Government of Rajasthan (1949–50)
 Member of Parliament of 1st Lok Sabha (1952–57)
 State President of Rajasthan Pradesh Congress Committee (1956–57)
 Member of Parliament of 2nd Lok Sabha (1957–62)
 First Chairman of Urban Improvement Trust, Alwar (1966–67)
 Member of 4th Rajasthan Legislative Assembly (1967–72)
 Agriculture Minister of Rajasthan (1967–71)
 Finance Minister of Rajasthan (1971–72)
 Member of 5th Rajasthan Legislative Assembly (1972–77)

References

1914 births
Year of death missing
India MPs 1952–1957
India MPs 1957–1962
Indian independence activists from Rajasthan
Indian National Congress politicians from Rajasthan
Lok Sabha members from Rajasthan
Members of Parliament from Rajasthan
Rajasthan MLAs 1967–1972
Rajasthan MLAs 1972–1977